Thần Tông is the temple name used for several emperors of Vietnam, derived from the Chinese equivalent Shénzōng. It may refer to:

Lý Thần Tông (1116–1138, reigned 1127–1138), emperor of the Lý dynasty
Lê Thần Tông (1532–1573, reigned 1556–1573 and 1649–1662), emperor of the Lê dynasty

See also
Shenzong (disambiguation), Chinese equivalent

Temple name disambiguation pages